is a Japanese manga series written by Minatsuki and illustrated by Asu Futatsuya, serialized online via Flex Comix's Comic Polaris website since June 2015. It has been collected in eight tankōbon volumes. An anime television series adaptation by Zero-G aired from January to March 2019.

Characters

A 23-year-old introverted mystery writer, who adopts Haru by chance. While he initially remains distant, they gradually bond with each other. Part of the story is shown from his point of view. Initially before the death of his parents he was always reluctant to visit crowded places, but after Haru entered his life, he understood the real value of love and started to interact with people better.

A stray Tuxedo cat, adopted by Subaru. Her life prior to being adopted was rough; she was trained by Miz Tora to survive in this harsh world and she took care of her four younger siblings and struggled to feed herself and them. She and Subaru rarely understand each other, but their misunderstandings lead to a common goal. Part of the story is shown from her point of view. She initially believes that her name is a sign for food as that's the name of the girl who once gave her food.

Subaru's editor at the publishing company. He tries hard to get Subaru to get out of the house, but often to no avail. He is fond of cats, especially Haru, and frequently visits the two.

Clerk at Sunny's Pet Store with a fondness for cats. She helps Subaru learn to care for Haru. Has two cats, one of which being Haru's younger brother.

Subaru's childhood friend. He often visits unannounced to drop off food for his friend, usually startling Haru.

Nana's younger brother, a 2nd-year high school student, and a fan of Subaru's novels. He visits his elder sister Nana and also loves cats.

Nana's Tuxedo Cat and Haru's brother.

Nana's 3-year-old cat.

A happy and friendly Golden Retriever that lives next door to Subaru and Haru.

Hiroto's 17-year-old sister who has a crush on Subaru.

Female Tiger Cat who taught Haru and her siblings to survive on the street.

Narumi's classmate and Haru's namesake. Her family runs a chūka restaurant.

Haru's mother.

A stray black cat who was friends with Tora.

Narumi's twin brother.

Hayato's twin sister.

Hiroto's 3-year-old sister.

Subaru's neighbor and Taro's owner.

 & 

Subaru's parents who were killed in a tour bus collision before the story begins.

Media

Manga
The series has been licensed in English by Lezhin Comics.

Anime
The anime adaption aired from January 9 to March 27, 2019 on AT-X, ABC, Tokyo MX and BS11. The series is animated by Zero-G and directed by Kaoru Suzuki, with Deku Akao handled the series composition, and Masaru Kitao designed the characters. Schrödinger's Cat and Kotringo performed the series' opening theme song , while Yoshino Nanjō performed the series' ending theme song . The series ran for 12 episodes. Crunchyroll streamed the series, while Funimation produced the English dub. Following Sony's acquisition of Crunchyroll, the dub was moved to Crunchyroll.

Reception
Anime News Network had five editors review the first episode of the anime: James Beckett found the first half with Subaru the weakest part, but praised the second half when moving from the cat's perspective; Theron Martin praised the "technical merits" of the premiere for showcasing a "more balanced and natural portrayal" of the cat and its point of view; Paul Jensen was critical of Subaru's introduction and a lack of "emotional drama" in his arc, but was hopeful of his growing development in the series and his adventures being retold from the cat's perspective, calling it "an enjoyable slice of life story" that will grab viewers outside of its core audience; Rebecca Silverman wrote that: "I'm not sure it will be able to sustain itself, but if a pet's ever made a difference in your life, this is worth checking out." The fifth reviewer, Nick Creamer, felt that Subaru's story contained "superfluous" interactions with other people, "insubstantial" humor and "purely functional" animation but gave praise to the cat's retelling of the events, concluding that: "In the end, My Roommate is a Cat is too lukewarm in its comedy and limited in its aesthetics to really grab me, but still offers a fairly reasonable premiere. If you're a big fan of all things cat, maybe give this one a try."

Silverman reviewed the complete anime series in 2020 and gave it an A– grade. While finding the flashbacks "a bit heavy-handed" when depicting both characters' lives before they met, she praised the accurate portrayal of cat behavior and the respectful exploration of both Subaru and Haru's anxiety problems, concluding that: "My Roommate is a Cat is definitely a cat person show, but it's also one for anybody who's anxious or understands the comfort of having an animal to make the world less scary. It has its heavy moments, but that just means that when things get lighter, we can really feel like maybe it'll all be okay." Stig Høgset, writing for THEM Anime Reviews, also praised the series for capturing "general kitty behavior" that's similar to Sketchbook ~full color's~ and utilizing a "restrained tone" when portraying its human and animal cast throughout the episodes, concluding that: "[T]here is a certain delightfulness to the antics of the characters in this show, including the animals, and that's why you should give My Roommate is a Cat a go." The series was nominated for Best Comedy at the 4th Crunchyroll Anime Awards, but lost to Kaguya-sama: Love Is War.

Notes

References

External links
 
 

2019 anime television series debuts
Animated television series about cats
Anime series based on manga
Comics about cats
Crunchyroll anime
Flex Comix manga
Iyashikei anime and manga
Japanese webcomics
Shōjo manga
Muse Communication
Webcomics in print
Zero-G (studio)